Sabrina Singh (born 1988) is an American administrator who has served as the Deputy Pentagon Press Secretary in the Department of Defense since April 2022. Singh previously served a Special Assistant to the President and Deputy Press Secretary for Vice President Kamala Harris in the Biden administration from 2021 to 2022.

Career 
She is an alumna of the USC School of International Relations.

Singh started her career as the press assistant at the Democratic Congressional Campaign Committee. She served as the Press Secretary to Kamala Harris, the current Vice President of the United States, when Harris was California's senator. Earlier, Singh was appointed as a National Spokesperson for Michael Bloomberg 2020 presidential campaign. She has also served as the National Press Secretary for Cory Booker 2020 presidential campaign. She was the Communications Director in the Hillary Clinton's 2016 presidential campaign. Singh has served as the Deputy Communications Director for the Democratic National Committee, and spokeswoman for American Bridge's Trump War Room.

Personal life 
Singh is married to Mike Smith, the political director for Nancy Pelosi, the former United States House of Representatives' Speaker. She is of Sikh heritage. Singh is the grand-daughter of Sardar Jagjit Singh (Sardar "JJ" Singh), a famed freedom fighter and the head of India League of America. Sardar JJ Singh hailed from Abbottabad in the present day Pakistan. The family moved to the United States before the Partition of India. Sabrina Singh's father, Man Jit Singh, was born in 1956 in New York City; when he was five years old, his parents moved the family to New Delhi of independent India. Man Jit and his brother Man Mohan grew up in Delhi. Following the death of Sardar JJ Singh in 1976, Man Jit Singh, who was a chairman and CEO of Sony India, and Sabrina's mother Srila Singh, decided to immigrate to the United States.

References

1988 births
American Sikhs
Biden administration personnel
Democratic National Committee people
Hillary Clinton 2016 presidential campaign
American politicians of Indian descent
Living people
USC School of International Relations alumni